Sammy Sum Chun-hin (born 4 May 1983) is an actor based in Hong Kong.

Biography
Sammy Sum speaks fluent Hong Kong Cantonese, Mandarin Chinese, Canadian French and North American English. He was born in Hong Kong, but at the age of 10 Sum moved to Montreal, Quebec, Canada with his family, where he spent all of his adolescent years until his early 20s. He moved back to Hong Kong in his mid 20s and entered the TVB entertainment business including starring in Hong Kong films.

In 2006, Sum auditioned for TVbeople, a talent casting system hosted by TVB, and was selected to sign a two-year artiste contract with the company along with six other winners. Before acting in dramas, he joined TVB's acting classes and graduated from TVB's 22nd Artiste Training Class of 2007. 

In 2014, Sum gained recognition with his performance in the crime drama Line Walker, for which he was nominated for Most Improved Male Artiste at the TVB Anniversary Awards.

Filmography

Television dramas

Films

References

External links
Sammy Sum at Sina Weibo
Sammy Sum at TVB.com

1983 births
Living people
Hong Kong male television actors
Hong Kong male film actors
TVB actors
21st-century Hong Kong male actors